Leopoldo Melo (18691951) was an Argentine lawyer, diplomat and politician. He was a leading figure in the Radical Civic Union, a nominee for president, and later minister of the interior.

Biography
Leopoldo Melo was born in Diamante, Entre Ríos Province, in 1869. He enrolled at the University of Buenos Aires and earned a Law Degree, later becoming an important leader in the centrist Radical Civic Union (UCR), the party chiefly responsible for the adoption of universal male suffrage in Argentina, in 1912. He was elected to the Argentine Chamber of Deputies for Entre Ríos Province in 1914 and to the Argentine Senate in 1917. While in Congress, he taught at his alma mater's Law School, and was its Dean in 1920 and 1921.

Elected on the UCR ticket, Melo broke with longtime UCR leader Hipólito Yrigoyen following the 1922 elections. Yrigoyen's fractious opposition, which together continued to enjoy a majority in the Upper House, appointed Melo Provisional President of the Senate in the same year. He led the establishment of the "Antipersonalist" UCR in 1924, becoming its caucus leader in the Senate.

He secured his party's nominatation for the presidency ahead of the 1928 election, though voters' support for the state oil concern established by Yrigoyen during his first term, YPF, and nostalgia for the aging leader himself translated into a landslide defeat for Melo and his running-mate, Vicente Gallo.

Following General José Félix Uriburu's 1930 coup against President Yrigoyen, Melo endorsed the conservative candidate (and Uriburu's pick), General Agustín Justo, on the grounds that the UCR nominee, former president Marcelo Torcuato de Alvear had been reunited with the Yrigoyen faction. Amid widespread irregularities, the Concordance formed by Melo and Justo won the 1931 elections, for which Melo was rewarded with an appointment to the powerful post of interior minister. Under his aegis the special branch of the Federal Police was created, implementing a policy of systematic torture of opposition figures.
 
Melo was dismissed as interior minister in 1936. In 1939, he was named representative to the Pan-American Union, where he participated in a mutual defense treaty entered into by the United States and most of the other nations of the Americas in 1940 as a response to World War II.

Melo retired from politics and continued to teach commercial and maritime law; he died in the seaside resort city of Pinamar in 1951.

References

1869 births
1951 deaths
People from Entre Ríos Province
University of Buenos Aires alumni
19th-century Argentine lawyers
Argentine diplomats
Academic staff of the University of Buenos Aires
Radical Civic Union politicians
Members of the Argentine Chamber of Deputies elected in Entre Ríos
Members of the Argentine Senate for Entre Ríos
Candidates for President of Argentina
People of the Infamous Decade
Burials at La Recoleta Cemetery
Ministers of Internal Affairs of Argentina
20th-century Argentine lawyers